Xi Zhikang (born 15 November 1956) is a former Chinese footballer and who is the currently caretaker manager Chinese Super League club Shanghai Port.

Playing career
Born in Shanghai, Xi played for the Shanghai team. During Su Yongshun's management of the Chinese national team, Xi received a call-up.

Managerial career
In 1994, following his retirement, Xi entered coaching. Xi's first coaching role was under Hu Zhigang's management of newly formed Shenzhen. Despite winning the Yi League, Xi moved on in 1995 to manage Shanghai Dashun. In 1998, Xi returned to manage the club, now known as Shanghai HSBC. In 2001, after a stint managing Shanghai Pudong, Zhikang joined the coaching staff at Shanghai Shenhua. In December 2011, Xi was announced as Shanghai Shenhua's manager. In 2013, Xi joined the coaching staff at rivals Shanghai SIPG. In December 2013, Xi was appointed manager of Shanghai SIPG for the upcoming 2014 Chinese Super League season.

Personal life
Xi is a member of the Chinese Communist Party.

References

1956 births
Footballers from Shanghai
Living people
Association football coaches
Association football forwards
Chinese footballers
China international footballers
Chinese football managers
Shanghai Shenhua F.C. players
Shanghai Shenhua F.C. managers
Shanghai Port F.C. managers
Chinese Super League managers
Chinese communists
Shanghai Shenhua F.C. non-playing staff
Shanghai Port F.C. non-playing staff